Álvaro Dias (14 January 1923 – 24 February 2005) was a Portuguese athlete. He competed in the men's long jump at the 1948 Summer Olympics.

References

External links
 

1923 births
2005 deaths
Athletes (track and field) at the 1948 Summer Olympics
Portuguese male long jumpers
Olympic athletes of Portugal
Sportspeople from Coimbra